In mathematics, there are several finiteness theorems.
Ahlfors finiteness theorem
Finiteness theorem for a proper morphism
Finiteness theorem for formal schemes